Hans Reinhold Ekström (born 1958) is a Swedish politician, teacher and member of the Riksdag, the national legislature. A member of the Social Democratic Party, he has represented Södermanland County since October 2010.

Ekström is the son of industrial official Carl-Axel Ekström and museum expert Gun Ekström (née Holmgren). He was educated in Eskilstuna and has a teaching degree. He was teacher in Eskilstuna Municipality from 1982 to 1992. He was a member of the municipal council in Eskilstuna Municipality from 1988 to 2010. He has been a member of the county administrative board in Södermanland County since 1995.

References

1958 births
Living people
Members of the Riksdag 2010–2014
Members of the Riksdag 2014–2018
Members of the Riksdag 2018–2022
Members of the Riksdag 2022–2026
Members of the Riksdag from the Social Democrats
People from Eskilstuna Municipality
Swedish schoolteachers